Natalia Perepechina (born 3 February 1990) is a Russian footballer who plays for Ryazan-VDV as a midfielder and has appeared for the Russia women's national team.

Career
Perepechina has been capped for the Russia national team, appearing for the team during the UEFA Women's Euro 2021 qualifying cycle.

References

External links
 
 

1990 births
Living people
Russian women's footballers
Russia women's international footballers
Women's association football midfielders
Ryazan-VDV players
Kubanochka Krasnodar players